Facundo Ezequiel Silva (born 19 January 1991) is an Argentine professional footballer who plays as a midfielder or winger for Quilmes.

Career
Silva began his footballing career in 2009 with Arsenal de Sarandí, making his debut in the Argentine Primera División in June 2009 during an away defeat to Huracán. Three league appearances later, Silva scored his first senior goal in a 1–1 draw against Argentinos Juniors on 23 November. In June 2011, Silva joined Defensa y Justicia of Primera B Nacional. He made a total of twenty appearances throughout his first two seasons with the club before leaving on loan twice in 2014 to join third tier sides San Jorge and San Martín. He scored seven goals in thirteen games for San Jorge, prior to one in eight for San Martín.

In January 2015, Silva signed for Central Córdoba. He made his debut in Primera B Nacional during a draw with Atlético Tucumán on 22 February. One further goal in thirty-one matches followed as Central Córdoba finished 15th in 2015. On 7 January 2016, Argentine Primera División side Godoy Cruz completed the permanent signing of Silva. Thirty appearances later, Silva was loaned out to fellow top-flight club Colón for the 2017–18 season. His debut arrived on 8 September 2017 versus former club Arsenal de Sarandí. January 2019 saw Silva move to Primera B Nacional's Los Andes.

Career statistics
.

References

External links

1991 births
Living people
Footballers from La Plata
Argentine footballers
Association football midfielders
Association football forwards
Argentine Primera División players
Primera Nacional players
Torneo Argentino A players
Torneo Federal A players
Arsenal de Sarandí footballers
Defensa y Justicia footballers
San Jorge de Tucumán footballers
San Martín de Tucumán footballers
Central Córdoba de Santiago del Estero footballers
Godoy Cruz Antonio Tomba footballers
Club Atlético Colón footballers
Club Atlético Los Andes footballers
Instituto footballers
Olimpo footballers
Quilmes Atlético Club footballers